Cadogan Group Limited and its subsidiaries, including Cadogan Estates Limited, are British property investment and management companies that are owned by the Cadogan family, one of the richest families in the United Kingdom. They also hold the titles of Earl Cadogan and Viscount Chelsea, the latter used as a courtesy title by the Earl's eldest son. The Cadogan Group is the main landlord in the west London districts of Chelsea and Knightsbridge, and it is now the second largest of the surviving aristocratic Freehold Estates in Central London, after the Duke of Westminster's Grosvenor Estate, to which it is adjacent, covering Mayfair and Belgravia.

Property
The Cadogan Estate covers 93 acres (over 376,000 square meters) of the Royal Borough of Kensington and Chelsea, including residential properties, offices and retail space. The Estate has been under the same family ownership for almost 300 years. The Foundations of the Estate were established in 1717 when Charles, second Baron Cadogan, married Elizabeth Sloane, daughter of Sir Hans Sloane, having purchased the Manor of Chelsea in 1712. This part of London has remained under the stewardship of the Cadogan family ever since, the tradition continuing today under the present Chairman, Viscount Chelsea, and his father, Earl Cadogan, who is Life President.[1]

Today the Estate includes approximately 3,000 flats, 200 houses, 300 shops, 500,000 square feet (over 46,000 square meters) of office space and over a dozen gardens covering 15 acres (some 60,000 square meters).[2]

The Estate's long history, family ownership and conservative financial structure permit a long-term approach, the area developing into one of London's most notable neighbourhoods.[3]

History
The company owes its origins to Sir Hans Sloane, a well-known explorer, physician and collector, having purchased the manor of Chelsea in 1712 and the 10-acre (40,000 m2) site of Beaufort House at Cheyne Walk in 1737. Sloane later died in 1753 without any male heirs, leaving his estate to two daughters.[1]

In 1777, Charles Sloane Cadogan – then Earl Cadogan – granted a lease to architect Henry Holland to create the first-ever purpose-built new town. "Hans Town" provided attractive Georgian terraced houses to people of moderately affluent means. Jane Austen and her brother lived in one; William Wilberforce, who led the movement to abolish slavery, in another.[2]

As London swelled during the industrial age, the 5th Earl Cadogan, George Henry Cadogan (1840-1915), undertook a review of his estate and decided on a comprehensive redevelopment. He commissioned cutting-edge architecture and a new red-brick style that became synonymous with the area: Pont Street Dutch. The opening of Sloane Square Station happened in 1868 and the completion of the riverside embankment in 1874. During the period 1877 to 1900 much of the modern Estate took shape. Cadogan Square – the "jewel in the crown" of the new development – the Royal Court Theatre at Sloane Square and Hotel Trinity Church on Sloane Street were built under the 5th Earl's auspices and received support from Cadogan to the present day.[3]

The 5th Earl was a Chelsea councillor and its first Mayor. His grandson, the 7th Earl was Chelsea's last (before being incorporated with the Royal Borough of Kensington). He died in 1997 aged 83, the title passing to Charles Gerald John Cadogan, the present Earl Cadogan. The 8th Earl, having been involved for many years as a director and then chairman, is now Life President of Cadogan. His son Viscount Chelsea is the current chairman.[4]

Chelsea has a bohemian history and has long been a haven for artists, authors, musicians and designers from Dante Gabriel Rossetti to The Rolling Stones and Vivienne Westwood. Jane Austen stayed in Sloane Street with her brother Henry whilst writing Pride and Prejudice, and poet and writer Oscar Wilde called the borough his home.[5]

Sloane Street
The Estate includes one of London's most upmarket retailing districts, based on Sloane Street, and also contains some very expensive residential property in some of central London's most sought after residential locations.
Originally commissioned by Charles, 1st Earl Cadogan in the 18th century, Sloane Street has evolved to become one of the world's most exclusive retail destinations – the epitome of London luxury. An impressive list of flagship stores - including Chloe, Salvatore Ferragamo, Giorgio Armani, Tom Ford and Valentino - line the street stretching from Knightsbridge to Sloane Square attracting a truly global clientele.

In July 2016, Cadogan launched George House, a £205 million office and retail development on Sloane Street that includes luxury flagship stores – Red Valentino, Boutique One, and Delpozo and smaller independent shops that can be accessed via Pavilion Road. George House also connects directly with new public realm, an open-air courtyard that also features a Granger & Co restaurant and gym from KX Urban.

Pavilion Road
Following a consultation with the local community in summer 2015, Cadogan pledged to create a destination for independent, artisan traders behind the new George House development on Sloane Street. Established fashion and beauty boutiques have now been joined by exciting new artisan food shops in November 2016: a traditional family butcher, Provenance;  fine wine shop – Pavilion Wine; bakery and school – Bread Ahead; Natoora – a fruit and vegetable specialist, offering a range of fresh seasonal produce and London Cheesemongers, who specialise in sourcing traditionally produced cheeses.

King's Road
The King's Road has roots dating back to the 17th century, when access along the route was only granted to those carrying a special token bearing the king's initials. The route was made public in 1830, at a time when the area was becoming settled by artists, creatives and bohemians who hugely influenced its legacy.

For today's locals and visitors, the Kings Road retains bohemian vibes, brought up to date with a rich array of stores, restaurants and coffee shops, cultural offerings, bars and much more. It is still one of Chelsea's most popular destinations and continues to attract a diverse crowd.

In October 2015, The Royal Borough of Kensington and Chelsea unanimously granted planning approval for Cadogan to redevelop 196-222 King's Road. Plans include a new 400-seat boutique cinema auditorium, a new pub for the local community, as well as retail, residential and office space that will respect the heritage and enhance the special character of its surroundings. Completion of the scheme is expected to be 2020.

Sloane Square

Sloane Square is at the heart of Chelsea and the Estate, and one of London's most glamorous locations for shopping, culture and dining. Its landmarks include the Royal Court Theatre and department store Peter Jones.

Cultural life on the square is richly served by the Royal Court Theatre and Cadogan Hall, home to the Royal Philharmonic Orchestra. Holy Trinity Sloane Square welcomes a thriving church community and is a must see for fans of the Arts and Crafts Movement.

Sloane Square today, ringed by London plane trees, is a place where visitors and residents meet, drawn by the attractions of its many shops and cafes; flagship stores line the square, and its side streets are filled with independent and artisan retailers.

Duke of York Square
Newly created by Cadogan in 2004, Duke of York Square was the first new public square to be opened in London for a century, and now hosts over 30 shops, 6 restaurants, flats, schools, offices and a weekly Fine Food Market. A massive undertaking to redevelop Ministry of Defence land and buildings, the project also created a new home for the Saatchi Gallery which displays one of the largest private collections of contemporary art and hosts free exhibitions seven days a week.  This carefully curated public square at the junction of King's Road and Sloane Square offers fashion, beauty, food and culture in the heart of Chelsea.

Current plans include a new café at the heart of the square, designed by NEX Architects. Their new vision for the café features a glass wall that is able to rise and fall depending on the weather – the first of its kind in the UK, due to open in 2018.

Cadogan Hall
Cadogan Hall, just north of Sloane Square, is another example of a successful acquisition and repurposing on the Estate. Cadogan bought it in 2000 as a dilapidated church and converted it into a world class concert hall that seats 900 – creating a new subsidised home for the Royal Philharmonic Orchestra. Incorporating state-of-the-art lighting and sound systems, plus bespoke acoustic technology appropriate to a world-class performance venue, the refurbishment retains many of the original features including stained glass windows by Baron von Rosenkrantz (who trained in Tiffany in New York).

Asbestos Exposure
On 14 June 2018, Westminster magistrates court fined Cadogan Estates a total of £180,000 for the 'uncontrolled release' of asbestos during renovation works to one of the Estate's properties. The asbestos contamination occurred at Rosetti Studios, Flood Street, Chelsea, in June 2015. Cadogan Estates admitted that there were failures in procedures to ensure the adequate control of asbestos during the renovation process.

See also
Other large privately owned historic estates in London include:
Bedford Estate (Bloomsbury)
Portman Estate (Marylebone)
Grosvenor Group (Mayfair and Belgravia)
Howard de Walden Estate (Marylebone)
Smith's Charity Estate (South Kensington, SW7)
Pettiward Estate (West Brompton, SW10 & Putney)

References

External links

Cadogan Estate
Family-owned companies of the United Kingdom
History of the Royal Borough of Kensington and Chelsea
Privately owned estates in London
Property companies based in London
Royal Borough of Kensington and Chelsea
1753 establishments in England
British companies established in 1753